James Walter Hopson (born October 13, 1968) is an American football coach and former player. In 2016, Hopson made history as the only head coach in the history of the state of Mississippi to guide two different in-state universities to bowl games when he led the University of Southern Mississippi Golden Eagles to a victory in the New Orleans Bowl. During his head-coaching tenure with the University of Southern Mississippi (2016-2020), Hopson ushered the Golden Eagles to four straight bowl-eligible seasons, with his defenses and offenses ranking in the top-5 and top-25 in the NCAA, respectively. Additionally, in his four full seasons from 2016 to 2019, Hopson guided the University of Southern Mississippi to 20 conference wins, which made him the second-winningest coach in Conference-USA during that span.

Prior to his time at Southern Miss, Hopson shook the landscape of collegiate football on May 28, 2012, when he was named the head coach at Alcorn State University, becoming the first white head football coach in the history of the Southwestern Athletic Conference, an organization made up entirely of historically black colleges and universities. Previously, Hopson served as an assistant coach at Tulane, Delta State, LSU, Florida, Marshall, Southern Miss, Ole Miss, Michigan, and Memphis. In total, Hopson has won or appeared in 16 bowl games across his 31-year coaching career and holds a head-coaching record of 60-40 (.600).

Hopson played college football at the University of Mississippi. He earned four letters as a defensive back at Ole Miss from 1988 to 1991, playing free safety for one season before moving to strong safety for his final three years. He was a four-time Academic All-SEC honor roll selection and was named to the Verizon District VI Academic All-America team as a senior in 1991.

Coaching Highlights

Florida (1995) 
During the 1995 season, Hopson helped the University of Florida Gators to a Southeastern Conference (SEC) championship and an appearance in the 1995 College Football National Championship held at the Fiesta Bowl.

Marshall (1996-2000) 
Hopson coached the Marshall defensive backfield and helped lead them to the NCAA FCS National Championship in 1996 and four-straight Mid-American Conference championships from 1997 to 2000. In 1999, his unit led the nation in interceptions and finished second in the nation in scoring defense. In 1997 and 1998, the Marshall secondary finished in the top-15 nationally in pass defense and the top-25 nationally in scoring defense, respectively.

Southern Miss (2001-2003) 
Hopson originally joined the Golden Eagles in 2001 as the Defensive Backs Coach and enjoyed success until his departure in 2003. His secondary led the country with the fewest passing touchdowns allowed and ranked fourth in the nation in pass efficiency defense in 2002. In 2003, Southern Miss captured the C-USA Championship. They also finished first in the C-USA and fifth in the NCAA in pass defense. In all three seasons, Southern Miss ranked in the top-15 nationally in scoring defense.

Ole Miss (2004) 
Hopson spent the 2004 season at his alma mater, the University of Mississippi, as Defensive Backs Coach. With Hopson in the fold, the Ole Miss pass defense improved from 109th nationally in 2003 to 49th during the 2004 campaign.

Southern Miss (2005-2007) 
In his second of three stints with the University of Southern Mississippi, Hopson served as the team's Defensive Coordinator from 2005 to 2007. In each of these three seasons, the Southern Miss defensive unit led Conference-USA in scoring defense, and Hopson went on to be named the 2007 All-American Football Foundation Assistant Coach of the Year. In 2006, Hopson's unit paced Conference-USA in third down defense and red zone defense while scoring seven touchdowns, setting a school record at the time. In 2005, they led the league in turnovers forced per game and topped the entire nation in fumbles gained.

Michigan (2008–2009) 
Linebackers coach under Rich Rodriguez.

Memphis (2010–2011) 
Defensive Coordinator under Larry Porter.

Alcorn State (2012-2015) 
May 28, 2012, marked a historic day in college football when the Alcorn State University Braves hired Jay Hopson as the first white head football coach in the history of the Southwestern Athletic Conference. Not only did Hopson break down barriers in his tenure with Alcorn State, but he completely turned around the football program, leading the team to back-to-back conference championships in 2014 and 2015 (the first-ever SWAC Championship game appearances in school history) and an HBCU national championship in 2014 (the school's first since 1984). Hopson's Braves won nine games in 2013—the most in 30 years—and proceeded to set a school record the following year with 10 wins in 2014. Then, in 2015, Hopson delivered another nine-win season that ended with the school's first-ever bowl appearance in the 2015 Celebration Bowl.    

In his final three years at Alcorn, Hopson's Braves won 28 contests, eclipsing the previous three-season high of 23. Additionally, the four-year win total of 32 made the 2015 senior class at Alcorn the winningest in school history.    

Amidst multiple years of team success, Hopson also collected personal accolades while with the Braves. In 2013, he was named a finalist for the Eddie Robinson Award as the FCS Coach of the Year before being named the BOXTOROW National Coach of the Year in 2014. What began in 2012 with upset wins over defending SWAC champion Grambling State University and an undefeated Alabama A&M University culminated in an era of success and championships not seen before in Alcorn State University history.

Southern Miss (2016-2020) 
Hopson was named head coach on January 30, 2016, and wasted no time making an impact. In his first game as head coach, Hopson led the Golden Eagles into enemy territory and defeated the University of Kentucky by a score of 44-35. The triumph marked the first time in 27 years that the University of Southern Mississippi beat an SEC opponent with a winning record. Hopson then went on to win 15 games across his first two seasons at the helm, tying a school record. In each of his four full seasons on the sideline, Hopson guided the Golden Eagles to bowl eligibility, with the team winning the 2016 New Orleans Bowl and appearing in the 2017 Independence Bowl and 2019 Armed Forces Bowl.

In his first four seasons, Hopson produced 11 Conference-USA first-team selections and mentored four Golden Eagles that went on to be taken in the NFL Draft. While under Hopson's direction, the Southern Miss defensive unit reached as high as 3rd in the entire NCAA in total yards against per game (287.4)—the best performance from a Golden Eagles defense since 2000—and the offensive unit reached as high as 21st in total yards per game (472.8). Hopson's repeated success on both sides of the ball resulted in 20 Conference-USA wins from 2016 to 2019, which was the second-most in that time period. No Southern Miss team coached by Jay Hopson in that span ever finished lower than 3rd place in Conference-USA (West).

Off the field, Hopson set out to overhaul the recruiting and facilities when he arrived at Southern Miss. Over the four-year period, his recruiting classes were consistently ranked at or near the top of the conference. Hopson also fundraised enough money to renovate the locker room, team meeting room, weight room and coaches room and transform them into a state-of-the-art complex.

Mississippi State University (2021-2022)

Defensive Analyst and Director of High School Relations under  Mike Leach.

Head coaching record

Playing Career/Education

Ole Miss (1988-1991) 
As a player at Ole Miss, Hopson earned four letters and received the 1991 John Howard Vaught Award of Excellence. A CoSIDA Academic All-American, Hopson graduated from Ole Miss with a bachelor's degree in business administration.

Delta State (1993-1994) 
While serving as a defensive backs coach with Delta State University, Hopson earned a master's of health in physical education and recreation.

Personal life 
Hopson and his wife, Michelle, have two daughters.

References

External links
 Southern Miss profile

1968 births
Living people
American football defensive backs
Alcorn State Braves football coaches
Delta State Statesmen football coaches
Florida Gators football coaches
LSU Tigers football coaches
Marshall Thundering Herd football coaches
Memphis Tigers football coaches
Michigan Wolverines football coaches
Ole Miss Rebels football coaches
Ole Miss Rebels football players
Southern Miss Golden Eagles football coaches
Tulane Green Wave football coaches
Sportspeople from Vicksburg, Mississippi